Nyctemera contrasta is a moth of the family Erebidae first described by Rob de Vos and Karel Černý in 1999. It is found in the Philippines (Mindanao, Negros, Palawan).

Subspecies
Nyctemera contrasta contrasta (Philippines: Mindanao)
Nyctemera contrasta negrosica De Vos & Černý, 1999 (Philippines: Negros)
Nyctemera contrasta supracontrasta De Vos & Černý, 1999 (Philippines: Palawan)

References

 

Nyctemerina
Moths described in 1999